Fernando Reutter (born 20 May 1958) is a Chilean alpine skier. He competed in the men's downhill at the 1976 Winter Olympics.

References

1958 births
Living people
Chilean male alpine skiers
Olympic alpine skiers of Chile
Alpine skiers at the 1976 Winter Olympics
Place of birth missing (living people)
20th-century Chilean people